Ilex montana, the mountain winterberry (or "mountain holly" which is more typically Ilex mucronata), is a species of holly native to the Eastern United States, ranging along the Appalachian Mountains from southeast Massachusetts to northeast Alabama and northern Georgia. Synonyms include Ilex monticola.

Description
The leaves are 3–9 cm long and 2–5 cm broad, light green, ovate or oblong, wedge-shaped or rounded at the base and acute at apex, with a serrated margin and an acuminate apex; they do not suggest the popular idea of a holly, with no spines or bristles. The leaves turn yellow before dropping in late autumn.

The flowers are 4–5 mm diameter, with a four-lobed white corolla, appearing in late spring when the leaves are more than half grown. The fruit is a spherical bright red drupe 8–10 mm diameter, containing four seeds.

Taxonomy
It is treated by some botanists as a variety of the related Ilex ambigua (Sand Holly), as I. ambigua var. monticola; the two are sometimes mistaken for each other in the U.S. southeastern coastal plain. The Latin specific epithet montana refers to mountains or coming from mountains.

References

External links

montana
Trees of the Southeastern United States
Trees of the Northeastern United States
Flora of the Appalachian Mountains
Natural history of the Great Smoky Mountains